Caruso may refer to:

 Caruso (surname), include a list of people with the name
 "Caruso" (song), a song written by Lucio Dalla
 Caruso, Alberta, a community in Canada
 Caruso Affiliated, a real estate development company in Los Angeles, California
 Caruso Sauce, a Uruguayan recipe for a warm sauce made of cream, ham, cheese, nuts and mushrooms
 Caruso Middle School, a middle school in Illinois

See also
 Crusoe (disambiguation)